Nicholas Baker (born 13 February 1985) is an Australian world champion lightweight rower. He won a gold medal at the 2011 World Rowing Championships in Bled with the lightweight men's eight.

Club and state rowing
Raised in Tasmania, Baker's senior club rowing was from the Lindisfarne Rowing Club in Hobart.

In 2008 Baker was selected to represent Tasmania in the men's lightweight four contesting the Penrith Cup at the Interstate Regatta within the Australian Rowing Championships. Such was the depth of Tasmanian lightweight rowing during Baker's peak years, that in 2010 and 2011 when he was in the Australian lightweight eight, he was unable to secure a seat in the Tasmanian state lightweight four.

In Lindisfarne club colours he contested the Australian men's lightweight pair title at the 2008 Australian Rowing Championships

International representative rowing
Baker was first selected to represent Australia at the 2007 World Rowing U23 Championships in Glasgow in a lightweight coxless pair which placed seventh. In 2008 he earned a seat in the Australian senior lightweight eight and raced at the 2008 World Rowing Championships in Linz to a seventh placing.

In 2010 at the World Championships in Lake Karapiro, Baker was seated at five in the Australian men's lightweight eight who placed second and won the silver medal.

The Australian lightweight eight stayed together into 2011 with the changeout of Perry Ward & Angus Tyers for Rod Chisolm & Tom Gibson and a move of Darryn Purcell into the stroke seat. At the 2011 World Championships in Bled they raced their final to perfection coming through the field from the 500mark, sitting second at the 1000 and the 1500, and running down the Italians in the last 200m to take the gold by 0.17seconds, winning Baker his first and only World Championship title.

References

External links
 
 Webster's coxswain call of the Australian LM8+ World Championship win of 2011

1985 births
Living people
Australian male rowers
World Rowing Championships medalists for Australia